Epipomponia multipunctata is a moth in the family Epipyropidae first described by Herbert Druce in 1887. It is found in Panama.

The forewings are deep black, with bands of small dark blue spots. The hindwings are uniform smoky black.

References

Moths described in 1887
Epipyropidae